Yang Zigang (born September 1958) is a Chinese diplomat who served as Chinese Ambassador to Suriname from 2013 to 2016 and Chinese Ambassador to Eritrea from 2017 to 2020.

Early life and education
Yang was born in Henan in September 1958.

Career
He joined the Foreign Service in 1975 and has served primarily in the General Office of the Ministry of Foreign Affairs of the People's Republic of China, where he was promoted to deputy director in 1999. He was deputy special representative of The Commissioner's Office of China's Foreign Ministry in the Hong Kong S.A.R. in 2007 and subsequently envoy to the Embassy of China, Washington, D.C. in 2010. In March 2013, President Xi Jinping appointed him Chinese Ambassador to Suriname according to the decision of the 12th National People's Congress Standing Committee, a post in which he served from 2013 to 2016. In January 2017, he succeeded Qiu Xuejun as Chinese Ambassador to Eritrea, and held that office until February 2020.

Award 
 8 April 2016  Palm Medal of Honor

References

1958 births
Living people
People from Henan
Ambassadors of China
Ambassadors to Eritrea
Ambassadors of China to Suriname